KSOL is a Spanish language radio station in San Francisco, California.

KSOL may also refer to:

Radio stations formerly known as KSOL:
KEST, radio station in San Francisco, California
KSAN (FM), radio station licensed to San Mateo, California
KYLD, radio station in San Francisco, California